Music from the Warner Bros. Picture "Sparkle" is a soundtrack album and twenty-fourth studio album by American singer Aretha Franklin, written and produced by Curtis Mayfield. Released on May 27, 1976, the disc is the soundtrack album for the 1976 Warner Bros. motion picture Sparkle, starring Irene Cara. The songs on the soundtrack feature the instrumental tracks and backing vocals from the film versions, with Franklin's voice taking the place of the original lead vocalists.

This album returned Aretha to Gold status after two low-selling albums. The first single release, "Something He Can Feel", was a  1 R&B hit for her and reached  28 on the Billboard Hot 100. However, it was Aretha's only Pop Top 40 hit during the second half of the 1970s. "Something He Can Feel" was nominated for the Best R&B Vocal Performance, Female grammy at the 1977 Grammy awards. The album itself reached the Top 20 of Billboards main album chart and was certified Gold for US sales of over 500,000 copies. In 2009, it was reissued on Rhino Records' budget Flashback Records label. The songs "Something He Can Feel" and "Hooked on Your Love" were covered by En Vogue on their 1992 multi-platinum hit album Funky Divas.

Track listing
All songs written by Curtis Mayfield.

"Sparkle" (4:13)
"Something He Can Feel" (6:21)
"Hooked on Your Love" (5:00)
"Look into Your Heart" (4:04)
"I Get High" (4:11)
"Jump" (2:19)
"Loving You Baby" (3:48)
"Rock with Me" (3:11)

Charts

Singles

Curtis Mayfield, Phil Upchurch, Gary Thompson - guitars
Rich Tufo, Floyd Morris - keyboards
Quinton Joseph - drums
Henry Gibson - congas, cowbell
Lucky Scott - bass

See also
List of number-one R&B albums of 1976 (U.S.)

References

Aretha Franklin albums
Curtis Mayfield soundtracks
1976 soundtrack albums
Albums produced by Curtis Mayfield
Curtom Records albums
Atlantic Records soundtracks
Rhino Records soundtracks
Musical film soundtracks
Drama film soundtracks